Sahani Upendra Pal Singh (15 October 1930 - 29 July 2021) was an Indian writer. He was one of the prominent writers in the Nagpuri-language in the modern period.  He translated "Ram Charit Manas" in Nagpuri. He wrote around 20 books in nagpuri. He was awarded "Jharkhand Ratna", "Praful Samman", "Seva Ratna" and "BCCL Koyal Bharti Rajbhasha award".

Life

Early life
He was born in Taragutu village in Gumla District to Birendra Pal Singh and Janak Nandini on 15 October 1930. He was from a Jamindar family. He completed his high school at Gumla High school in 1952. He was not able to pursue higher Studies due to family issues.

Personal life
He married Chandrabali Devi in 1950. He had two daughters and four sons.

Works
Singh wrote more than 20 books in nagpuri.   He translated "Ram Charit Manas" and poems by Kali Das in Nagpuri. His written book "Mewar Keshri" is taught in the Nagpuri B.A honours course. He wrote a book named "Amba Manjar" in 2006 which was about the culture of Jharkhand and India.

Death
He died on 29 July 2021 in his residence, Gokul Nagar, Gumla.

Awards
He was awarded the Jharkhand Ratna, Hirak Samman, Praful Samman, Seva Ratna and BCCL Koyal Bharti Rajbhasha award.

References

1930 births
2021 deaths
20th-century Indian writers
21st-century Indian writers
People from Gumla district
Nagpuri-language writers
Nagpuria people